Timothy C. Idoni was elected mayor of the city of New Rochelle, New York, in 1991, and was reelected three times. He resigned in January 2006 after having been elected Westchester County Clerk. His term expired at the end of 2009.

During his years as mayor, New Rochelle's downtown underwent substantial redevelopment. A long period of economic decay came to an end, as tenements, vacant stores and light industry were replaced with middle to upper income apartment buildings, an entertainment complex, parkland, and large retailers. About 2,000 jobs were created, and the tax base was significantly expanded.

He was preceded in office by Leonard Paduano, a Republican, and succeeded by Noam Bramson, a Democrat.

A Democrat, Idoni ran against Linda Doherty, Clerk of Eastchester, for Westchester County Clerk in 2005. Since taking office, he has worked to update the information technology of the county's licensing and record-keeping operations.

References

Living people
Politicians from New Rochelle, New York
Mayors of places in New York (state)
County clerks in New York (state)
Politicians from Westchester County, New York
New York (state) Democrats
Iona University alumni
1955 births